Altona North is a suburb in Melbourne, Victoria, Australia,  south-west of Melbourne's Central Business District, located within the City of Hobsons Bay local government area.

Bordering suburbs include Altona, Brooklyn, Laverton North, Newport, South Kingsville, Williamstown North and Yarraville. In addition to the Paisley Park sporting complex, Altona North is home to three parks; S J Clement Reserve – Gilligan Rd, W L J Crofts Reserve – Blackshaws Rd and Urban Forest Reserve – Grieve Pde.

History

The Altona area was home to Kurung-Jang-Balluk Aboriginal people, of the Woiwurrung clan.

Altona North Post Office first opened on 11 April 1960 as suburban development took place. In 1966 it was renamed Beevers when a new Altona North office opened in Duke Street to the south. In 1986 Altona Gate Office replaced Beevers.

The Prince and Princess of Wales officially opened the Mason Street Housing Commission Estate in their 1983 royal visit.

Demographics

The next most common countries of birth were Italy 4.3%, Lebanon 4.2%, Vietnam 3.4%, Greece 3.4% and Malta 1.8%. 45.2% of people only spoke English at home. Other languages spoken at home included Arabic 13.1%, Italian 6.1%, Greek 5.7%, Vietnamese 4.3% and Maltese 1.9%. The most common responses for religion were Catholic 26.9%, No Religion 20.4% and Islam 15.9%.

Transport
 Route 232: Altona North to City (Queen Victoria Market)
 Route 411: Laverton Station to Footscray (via Altona Meadows and Altona)
 Route 412: Laverton Station to Footscray (via Altona Meadows and Altona)
 Route 414: Laverton Station to Footscray
 Route 432: Newport to Yarraville (via Altona Gate Shopping Centre)
 Route 471: Williamstown to Sunshine Station (via Newport and Altona Gate Shopping Centre)
 Route 903: Altona to Mordialloc (SMARTBUS Service)
 Route 944: City to Point Cook (Night Bus Service)

Industry

The Altona Refinery, one of two oil refineries in Victoria, is located in the suburb's south-east. It is owned and operated by ExxonMobil. Altona North was home to the Don Smallgoods factory from 1970 to 2011 when it closed and moved to a new factory in Castlemaine.

Attractions
 Altona Gate Shopping Centre
 Kororoit Creek Trail
 Kororoit Creek
 In 2012, British festival promoters All Tomorrow's Parties held a festival called I’ll Be Your Mirror across two stages at The Westgate Entertainment Centre and Grand Star Receptions, Dohertys Road Altona North. Headline acts included My Bloody Valentine, The Drones and Beasts of Bourbon.

Sport

Altona Lakes Golf Club at Paisley Park, Mason Street, is a 9-hole golf course and Driving Range. Also located within the Paisley Park sporting complex is Altona Badminton Centre, which opened in 1985. The badminton centre contains 12 courts and is open seven days a weeks. The Paisley Park sporting facility also includes a gymnasium, swimming pool, premier league soccer facility, bowling club, miniature railway and lacrosse fields.

Altona Magic, the local football (soccer) team plays in the Victorian Premier League and Altona East Phoenix play in the Victorian State League 2 N/W.

See also
 City of Altona – Altona North was previously within this former local government area.
 Altona Memorial Park – cemetery and crematorium on Dohertys Road

References

External links
Cr Tony Briffa JP – Local councillor and Deputy Mayor of Hobsons Bay (including Altona North)
Hobsons Bay Community Online Forum

Suburbs of Melbourne
Suburbs of the City of Hobsons Bay